The Convention on the Regulation of Antarctic Mineral Resource Activities (popular as CRAMRA) is a treaty that is part of the Antarctic Treaty System. The convention was concluded at Wellington on 2 June 1988. The government of New Zealand is the depository of the treaty.

The convention was signed by 19 states, but no states have ratified it. Therefore, the convention has not entered into force and has been replaced by the 1998 Protocol on Environmental Protection to the Antarctic Treaty (Madrid Protocol).

Notes

External links
Text, PDF.
Signatories and status, mfat.govt.nz.

Antarctica agreements 
1988 in Antarctica
Treaties concluded in 1988
Unratified treaties
1988 in New Zealand